Tenguella musiva, common names mosaic purpura, musical drupe, is a species of sea snail, a marine gastropod mollusk, in the family Muricidae, the murex snails or rock snails.

References

 Liu, J.Y. [Ruiyu] (ed.). (2008). Checklist of marine biota of China seas. China Science Press. 1267 pp

External links
 Poupre mosaique, Purpura musiva original description in Latin and French. Louis Charles Kiener, Spécies général et iconographie des coquilles vivantes : comprenant la collection du Muséum d'histoire naturelle de Paris, la collection Lamarck, celle du Prince Masséna ... et les déecouvertes réecentes des voyageurs, tome 1, part 3, page 38. Illustration, plate 9, figure 22.
 Illustration (fig. 52) by Sowerby in Reeve's Conchologia Iconica (1845).

musiva
Gastropods described in 1835